François-Robert Fenwick Brown (24 September 1837, Bordeaux – 29 September 1915, Caudéran, Gironde) also known as Robert-Francois Brown; Francois Robert Fenwick Brown, was a French entomologist who specialised in Microlepidoptera. He was a Member of the Société entomologique de France.

His collections are held by the Société Linnéenne de Bordeaux (Muséum d'histoire naturelle de Bordeaux).

Works
Catalogue raisonné des microlépidoptères observés en Gironde jusqu'en 1915 Actes de la Société linnéenne de Bordeaux, 1917

References	
Lambertie, M. 1916: [Brown, F. R. F.] Annales de la Société Entomologique de France , Paris 85: 188–196
Oberthür, C. 1916: [Brown, F. R. F.] Etudes de lepidopterologie comparée 11	
Gaedicke in Groll, E. K. (Hrsg.): Biografien der Entomologen der Welt : Datenbank. Version 4.15 : Senckenberg Deutsches Entomologisches Institut, 2010.

French lepidopterists
1837 births
1915 deaths
Scientists from Bordeaux
19th-century French zoologists
20th-century French zoologists